Narezne Glacier is the 7 km long and 2.2 km wide glacier on Loubet Coast in Graham Land, Antarctica situated on the west side of Avery Plateau south of Field Glacier, northwest of the head of Finsterwalder Glacier and north of Haefeli Glacier. It flows northwestwards and joins Field Glacier west of Barziya Peak.

The glacier is named after the cave of Narezne in Northwestern Bulgaria.

Location
British mapping in 1978.

Maps
Antarctic Digital Database (ADD). Scale 1:250000 topographic map of Antarctica. Scientific Committee on Antarctic Research (SCAR). Since 1993, regularly upgraded and updated.
British Antarctic Territory. Scale 1:200000 topographic map. DOS 610 Series, Sheet W 67 66. Directorate of Overseas Surveys, Tolworth, UK, 1978.

References
 Bulgarian Antarctic Gazetteer. Antarctic Place-names Commission. (details in Bulgarian, basic data in English)
 Narezne Glacier. SCAR Composite Antarctic Gazetteer

External links
 Narezne Glacier. Copernix satellite image

Bulgaria and the Antarctic
Glaciers of Loubet Coast